Worst Cooks in America is an American reality television series that premiered on January3, 2010, on Food Network. The show takes 12 to 16 contestants (referred to as "recruits") with very poor cooking skills through a culinary boot camp, to earn a cash prize of $25,000 and a Food Network cooking set. In the celebrity edition of the show, the winning celebrity gets a $50,000 prize to donate to the charity of their choice. The recruits are trained on the various basic cooking techniques including baking, knife skills, temperature, seasoning and preparation. The final challenge is to cook a restaurant-quality, three-course meal for three food critics.

History

Chef Chart
Chef Anne Burrell has led the Red team in every season to date.

Season 1: 2010
Chefs Beau MacMillan and Anne Burrell lead an intense culinary boot camp. They have six recruits each, and every week they must eliminate one recruit from each of their teams until there is only one from each team left. The final two create a three-course meal to fool a panel of restaurant critics into believing that the meal was created by the acclaimed chefs.

Recruits
Twelve chefs competed in the first season of Worst Cooks in America. Hometowns and occupations are available from the Food Network website. Chef Anne's team was known as the Red Team and Chef Beau's team was known as the Blue Team.

Contestant progress and episodes
Red: Team Anne
Blue: Team Beau

Key
  (WINNER) This contestant won the competition and was crowned "Best of the Worst".
 (RUNNER-UP) The contestant was the runner-up in the finals of the competition.
 (WIN) The contestant did the best on their team in the week's Main Dish challenge and was considered the winner.
 (BTM) The contestant was selected as one of the bottom entries in the Main Dish challenge, but was not eliminated.
 (OUT) The contestant lost that week's Main Dish challenge and was out of the competition.
* Initially a member of the other team but switched after Chef Beau won the bet on whose team member made the best crepes.

Season 2: 2011
Casting for season 2 of Worst Cooks in America was held at the LA Marriott Burbank Airport, Hotel & Convention Center on March 27, 2010. The Food Network also began accepting online video applications for season 2. Food Network's website announced that Robert Irvine would replace Beau MacMillan for season 2. Season 2 debuted on January 2, 2011. In this season the chefs had eight recruits each.

Recruits

Contestant progress
Red: Team Anne
Blue: Team Robert

Key
  (WINNER) This contestant won the competition and was crowned "Best of the Worst".
 (RUNNER-UP) The contestant was the runner-up in the finals of the competition.
 (WIN) The contestant did the best on their team in the week's Main Dish challenge and was considered the winner.
 (BTM) The contestant was selected as one of the bottom entries in the Main Dish challenge, but was not eliminated.
 (OUT) The contestant lost that week's Main Dish challenge and was out of the competition.
* Initially a member of the other team but switched after Chef Robert won the bet on whose team member made the best burgers.

Differences between seasons 1 and 2 

In the first episode, a group of selected novice cooks were to prepare a dish from scratch so the chefs would get an idea of how poor their skills were. After tasting all the items, the chefs took turns picking team members for their rival chef. The first season started off with 24 novice cooks but only the worst 12 were chosen for a team. In the second season, the first episode began with 16 amateurs and all took part for the remainder of that episode.

In the penultimate episode of the season, the remaining four recruits learned and replicated a dessert. After this, in the first season, the recruits had to instruct a group of high school students how to replicate the dessert recipe. In the second one, the recruits were assigned the dessert to serve after both chefs, and a special guest enjoyed a main dish.

After learning and replicating a dessert, the recruits had to prepare a meal for both chefs and a surprise guest, usually a spouse or other family member. The first season's main dishes were an improved version of the recruits’ audition meal. The special guests in the second season got to choose what they wanted the students to make them.

Two recruits remained in the final episode and had to prepare an appetizer, main dish, and dessert for a panel of three food critics. The critics in season 1 thought that the final meal was prepared by the chefs until after they sampled all the courses. In season 2, the critics learned their meal was prepared by the recruits immediately after entering the restaurant.

Season 3: 2012
Anne Burrell hosted season 3 with Bobby Flay, who replaced Robert Irvine.

Recruits

Contestant progress
Red: Team Anne
Blue: Team Bobby

: In Episode 3, Team Bobby (blue team) won the first challenge; he therefore got to choose one person from Team Anne (red team) to go to his team, and then choose one person from his team to go to the other team. He chose David to go to Team Anne's team and chose Melissa from Team Anne's team to join his team.

Key
  (WINNER) This contestant won the competition and was crowned "Best of the Worst".
 (RUNNER-UP) The contestant was the runner-up in the finals of the competition.
 (WIN) The contestant did the best on their team in the week's Main Dish challenge and was considered the winner.
 (BTM) The contestant was selected as one of the bottom entries in the Main Dish challenge, but was not eliminated.
 (OUT) The contestant lost that week's Main Dish challenge and was out of the competition
 (QUIT) The contestant volunteered to quit

Season 4: 2013

Recruits

Contestant progress
Red: Team Anne
Blue: Team Bobby

Key
  (WINNER) This contestant won the competition and was crowned "Best of the Worst".
 (RUNNER-UP) The contestant was the runner-up in the finals of the competition.
 (WIN) The contestant did the best on their team in the week's Main Dish challenge and was considered the winner.
 (BTM) The contestant was selected as one of the bottom entries in the Main Dish challenge, but was not eliminated.
 (OUT) The contestant lost that week's Main Dish challenge and was out of the competition.

†: Contestant died after filming.

Season 5: 2014

Recruits

Contestant progress
Red: Team Anne
Blue: Team Bobby

: In Episode 3, Team Anne (red team) won the first challenge. She was allowed to steal one person from Team Bobby (blue team) and send one person from her own team as a replacement. She decided to steal Carie, and sent Stephanie to Team Bobby. 

Key
  (WINNER) This contestant won the competition and was crowned "Best of the Worst".
 (RUNNER-UP) The contestant was the runner-up in the finals of the competition.
 (WIN) The contestant did the best on their team in the week's Main Dish challenge and was considered the winner.
 (BTM) The contestant was selected as one of the bottom entries in the Main Dish challenge but was not eliminated.
 (OUT) The contestant lost that week's Main Dish challenge and was out of the competition.
 (IN) The contestant get switched by the host to the other team. Ex: A member of the red team goes to the blue team, and a member of the blue team goes to the red team.

Season 6: 2015
Tyler Florence joined Anne Burrell to host season 6, replacing Bobby Flay after 3 seasons. The season premiered on January 4, 2015, to 2,123,000 viewers. The second episode was lower at 1,456,000 viewers, with the third episode rising to 1,732,000 viewers and the fourth episode reached 1,689,000 viewers. the 5th episode reached 1,634,000 viewers. The sixth episode received 1.55 million viewers.

Recruits

Contestant Stephanie Streisand was deemed too ill to continue on January 11

Contestant progress
Red: Team Anne
Blue: Team Tyler

Key
  (WINNER) This contestant won the competition and was crowned "Best of the Worst".
 (RUNNER-UP) The contestant was the runner-up in the finals of the competition.
 (WIN) The contestant did the best on their team in the week's Main Dish challenge or Skill Drill and was considered the winner.
 (BTM) The contestant was selected as one of the bottom entries in the Main Dish challenge, but was not eliminated.
 (OUT) The contestant lost that week's Main Dish challenge and was out of the competition.
 (WDR) The contestant withdrew from the competition due to illness.

Season 7: Celebrity Edition 1
Rachael Ray joins Anne Burrell to host season 7. The winner earns a $50,000 donation for their chosen charity. Because this season had only 7 total recruits, each team's worst recruit from that week's Main Dish challenge competed head to head in a quickfire elimination challenge instead of eliminating both recruits each week. This challenge involved more basic cooking techniques (e.g. knife skills) and the winner would be decided by a blind judging from both Anne and Rachael. The winning recruit stayed in the competition while the losing recruit was eliminated.

Recruits

Contestant progress
Red: Team Anne
Blue: Team Rachael

Key
  (WINNER) This contestant won the competition and was crowned "Best of the Worst".
 (RUNNER-UP) The contestant was the runner-up in the finals of the competition.
 (WIN) The contestant did the best on their team in the week's Main Dish challenge or Skill Drill and was considered the winner.
 (BTM) The contestant was selected as one of the bottom entries in the Main Dish challenge, but was not eliminated.
 (OUT) The contestant lost that week's Main Dish challenge and was out of the competition.

Season 8: 2016
Tyler Florence joins Anne Burrell to host season 8.

Recruits

Contestant progress
Red: Team Anne
Blue: Team Tyler

Key
  (WINNER) This contestant won the competition and was crowned "Best of the Worst".
 (RUNNER-UP) The contestant was the runner-up in the finals of the competition.
 (WIN) The contestant did the best on their team in the week's Main Dish challenge or Skill Drill and was considered the winner.
 (TIE) The contestant tied with another contestant as the best on their team in the week's Main Dish challenge or Skill Drill.
 (BTM) The contestant was selected as one of the bottom entries in the Main Dish challenge, but was not eliminated.
 (OUT) The contestant lost that week's Main Dish challenge and was out of the competition.

Season 9: Celebrity Edition 2
Rachael Ray returns with Anne Burrell to host season 2 of the Celebrity Edition. The winner earns a $50,000 donation for their chosen charity. The season premiered on September 14, 2016, to 1,185,000 viewers.

Recruits

Season 10: 2017 
Rachael Ray joins Anne Burrell to host season 10. The season premiered on January 1, 2017.

Recruits

Contestant progress
Red: Team Anne
Blue: Team Rachael

Key
  (WINNER) This contestant won the competition and was crowned "Best of the Worst".
 (RUNNER-UP) The contestant was the runner-up in the finals of the competition.
 (WIN) The contestant did the best on their team in the week's Main Dish challenge or Skill Drill and was considered the winner.
 (TIE) The contestant tied with another contestant as the best on their team in the week's Main Dish challenge or Skill Drill.
 (BTM) The contestant was selected as one of the bottom entries in the Main Dish challenge, but was not eliminated.
 (OUT) The contestant lost that week's Main Dish challenge and was out of the competition.
 (SAVE) The contestant lost that week's Main Dish challenge but was saved by their respective team mentor.

In Episode 6, Both Chef Anne and Chef Rachael decided not to send anyone from their teams home.

Season 11: Celebrity Edition 3
Rachael Ray returns with Anne Burrell to host season 3 of the Celebrity Edition. The season premiered on August 23, 2017.

Recruits

Note: Vivica was originally eliminated on September 20. In Episode 7, airing on October 4, both Vivica and Sean returned to the competition for a redemption skill drill. Vivica won the drill, re-entered the competition and was then eliminated for the second time following the main challenge.

Contestant progress
Red: Team Anne
Blue: Team Rachael

Key
  (WINNER) This contestant won the competition and was crowned "Best of the Worst".
 (RUNNER-UP) The contestant was the runner-up in the finals of the competition.
 (WIN) The contestant did the best on their team in the week's Main Dish challenge or Skill Drill and was considered the winner.
 (BTM) The contestant was selected as one of the bottom entries in the Main Dish challenge but was not eliminated 
 (OUT) The contestant lost that week's Main Dish challenge and was out of the competition.
 (WDR) The contestant withdrew from the competition due to illness or injury.
 (RTN) The contestant won the redemption Skill Drill and returned to the competition.

Season 12: 2018
Tyler Florence joins Anne Burrell to host season 12.

Three contestants from this season—runner-up Steven Crowley, Sharon Shvarzman, and Kevin Pettice—would compete in, and win, season 9 of The Great Food Truck Race.

Recruits

Contestant progress
Red: Team Anne
Blue: Team Tyler

Key
  (WINNER) This contestant won the competition and was crowned "Best of the Worst".
 (RUNNER-UP) The contestant was the runner-up in the finals of the competition.
 (WIN) The contestant did the best on their team in the week's Main Dish challenge or Skill Drill and was considered the winner.
 (TIE) The contestant tied with another contestant as the best on their team in the week's Main Dish challenge or Skill Drill.
 (BTM) The contestant was selected as one of the bottom entries in the Main Dish challenge, but was not eliminated.
 (OUT) The contestant lost that week's Main Dish challenge and was out of the competition.
 (QUIT) The contestant volunteered to leave the competition.

In episode 5, contestants Lacey and Spencer switch teams instead of being eliminated, Lacey on Chef Anne's Team and Spencer on Chef Tyler's team.

Season 13: Celebrity Edition 4
Tyler Florence returns with Anne Burrell to host season 4 of the Celebrity Edition. This is the first Celebrity Edition to not feature Rachael Ray as a judge. The season premiered on April 15, 2018.

Recruits

Contestant progress
Red: Team Anne
Blue: Team Tyler

Key
  (WINNER) This contestant won the competition and was crowned "Best of the Worst".
 (RUNNER-UP) The contestant was the runner-up in the finals of the competition.
 (WIN) The contestant did the best on their team in the week's Main Dish challenge or Skill Drill and was considered the winner.
 (BTM) The contestant was selected as one of the bottom entries in the Main Dish challenge but was not eliminated.
 (OUT) The contestant lost that week's Main Dish challenge and was out of the competition.

Season 14: 2018
Robert Irvine rejoined Anne Burrell to host season 14.

Recruits

Contestant progress
Red: Team Anne
Blue: Team Robert

Key
  (WINNER) This contestant won the competition and was crowned "Best of the Worst".
 (RUNNER-UP) The contestant was the runner-up in the finals of the competition.
 (WIN) The contestant did the best on their team in the week's Main Dish challenge or Skill Drill and was considered the winner.
 (BTM) The contestant was selected as one of the bottom entries in the Main Dish challenge, but was not eliminated.
 (OUT) The contestant lost that week's Main Dish challenge and was out of the competition.

Season 15: 2019
Tyler Florence joins Anne Burrell to host season 15. Since the number of contestants is odd, one of them is eliminated before getting into the teams.

Recruits

Contestant progress
Red: Team Anne
Blue: Team Tyler

Key
  (WINNER) This contestant won the competition and was crowned "Best of the Worst".
 (RUNNER-UP) The contestant was the runner-up in the finals of the competition.
 (WIN) The contestant did the best on their team in the week's Main Dish challenge or Skill Drill and was considered the winner.
 (BTM) The contestant was selected as one of the bottom entries in the Main Dish challenge, but was not eliminated.
 (OUT) The contestant lost that week's Main Dish challenge and was out of the competition.
 Chaz was eliminated after the baseline challenge because his dish was the worst.

Season 16: Celebrity Edition 5
Tyler Florence returns with Anne Burrell to host the fifth run of the Celebrity Edition. The season premiered on April 21, 2019.

Recruits

Contestant progress
Red: Team Anne
Blue: Team Tyler

Key
  (WINNER) This contestant won the competition and was crowned "Best of the Worst".
 (RUNNER-UP) The contestant was the runner-up in the finals of the competition.
 (WIN) The contestant did the best on their team in the week's Main Dish challenge or Skill Drill and was considered the winner.
 (BTM) The contestant was selected as one of the bottom entries in the Main Dish challenge but was not eliminated 
 (OUT) The contestant lost that week's Main Dish challenge and was out of the competition.
 (QUIT) The contestant volunteered to leave the competition.

Season 17: 2019
Bobby Flay joins Anne Burrell to host season 17. The season, featuring 14 recruits, debuted on August 4, 2019.

Recruits

Contestant progress
Red: Team Anne
Blue: Team Bobby

Key
  (WINNER) This contestant won the competition and was crowned "Best of the Worst".
 (RUNNER-UP) The contestant was the runner-up in the finals of the competition.
 (WIN) The contestant did the best on their team in the week's Main Dish challenge or Skill Drill and was considered the winner.
 (BTM) The contestant was selected as one of the bottom entries in the Main Dish challenge, but was not eliminated.
 (OUT) The contestant lost that week's Main Dish challenge and was out of the competition.

Season 18: 2020
Alton Brown joins Anne Burrell to host season 18. The season, featuring 16 recruits, premiered on January 5, 2020.

Recruits

Contestant progress
Red: Team Anne
Blue: Team Alton

Key
  (WINNER) This contestant won the competition and was crowned "Best of the Worst".
 (RUNNER-UP) The contestant was the runner-up in the finals of the competition.
 (WIN) The contestant did the best on their team in the week's Main Dish challenge or Skill Drill and was considered the winner.
 (BTM) The contestant was selected as one of the bottom entries in the Main Dish challenge, but was not eliminated.
 (OUT) The contestant lost that week's Main Dish challenge and was out of the competition.

In episode 4, Chef Alton deemed the recruits' performances in the Main Dish challenge are too flawed to declare a winner in his team.

Season 19: Celebrity Edition 6
Tyler Florence returns with Anne Burrell to host the sixth run of the Celebrity Edition. The season premiered on May 10, 2020.

Recruits

Contestant progress

Key
  (WINNER) This contestant won the competition and was crowned "Best of the Worst".
 (RUNNER-UP) The contestant was the runner-up in the finals of the competition.
 (WIN) The contestant did the best on their team in the week's Main Dish challenge or Skill Drill and was considered the winner.
 (BTM) The contestant was selected as one of the bottom entries in the Main Dish challenge but was not eliminated.
 (OUT) The contestant lost that week's Main Dish challenge and was out of the competition.

Season 20: 2020
Alex Guarnaschelli joins Anne Burrell to host season 20. The season debuted on June 21, 2020.

The entire run of this season, along with text summaries of it, was pulled from all Discovery platforms on January 23, 2021, after the season's champion, Ariel Robinson, was charged with homicide by child abuse with her husband for the racially motivated murder of her three-year-old white adopted daughter.

Recruits

Contestant progress
Red: Team Anne
Blue: Team Alex

Key
  (WINNER) This contestant won the competition and was crowned "Best of the Worst".
 (RUNNER-UP) The contestant was the runner-up in the finals of the competition.
 (WIN) The contestant did the best on their team in the week's Main Dish challenge or Skill Drill and was considered the winner.
 (BTM) The contestant was selected as one of the bottom entries in the Main Dish challenge, but was not eliminated.
 (OUT) The contestant lost that week's Main Dish challenge and was out of the competition.

Season 21: 2021
Carla Hall joins Anne Burrell to host season 21. The season debut on January 3, 2021, with a 90-minute premiere. Immediately following, spin-off companion series Worst Cooks in America: Dirty Dishes begins its first-ever run. The show sees former boot camp contestants and comedians commenting on past episodes.

An additional twist added this season is the "Danger Zone," in which the worst recruit on each team in the Skill Drill must cook their Main Dish at the stations used by Burrell and Hall in demonstrating the recipe, giving the mentors the ability to keep a close eye on them as they cook.

Recruits

Contestant progress
Red: Team Anne
Blue: Team Carla

Key
  (WINNER) This contestant won the competition and was crowned "Best of the Worst".
 (RUNNER-UP) The contestant was the runner-up in the finals of the competition.
 (WIN) The contestant did the best on their team in the week's Main Dish challenge or Skill Drill and was considered the winner.
 (IMM) The contestant won immunity and was safe from elimination in the week's Main Dish Challenge.
 (BTM) The contestant was selected as one of the bottom entries in the Main Dish challenge, but was not eliminated.
 (OUT) The contestant lost that week's Main Dish challenge and was out of the competition.
* Initially a member of the other team but switched instead of being eliminated.

Season 22: Best of the Worst
Michael Symon joins Anne Burrell for the first time to host a new Best of the Worst season where fan-favorite recruits from past seasons return for another chance at redemption. The season premiered on April 25, 2021.

Recruits

Contestant progress
Red: Team Anne
Blue: Team Michael

Key
  (WINNER) This contestant won the competition and was crowned "Best of the Worst".
 (RUNNER-UP) The contestant was the runner-up in the finals of the competition.
 (IMM) The contestant won immunity and was safe from elimination in the week's Main Dish Challenge.
 (WIN) The contestant did the best on their team in the week's Main Dish challenge or Skill Drill and was considered the winner.

 (BTM) The contestant was selected as one of the bottom entries in the Main Dish challenge but was not eliminated.
 (OUT) The contestant lost that week's Main Dish challenge and was out of the competition.

Season 23: 2022
Cliff Crooks joins Anne Burrell to host season 23. The season debuted on January 5, 2022.

This season features two additional twists. First, the cast includes 5 pairs of recruits with previously established relationships: Angie & Cheyenne (long-lost cousins), Bianca & Hector (married), Deneise & Hilda (neighbors), Eddie & Kara (married), and Marti & Peachez (best friends). Second, this season features alternating elimination weeks for each team, with the winning recruit on the non-eliminating team receiving a $1,000 prize each week.

Recruits

Contestant progress
Red: Team Anne
Blue: Team Cliff

Key
  (WINNER) This contestant won the competition and was crowned "Best of the Worst".
 (RUNNER-UP) The contestant was the runner-up in the finals of the competition.

 (WIN) The contestant did the best on their team in the week's Main Dish Challenge and was considered the winner.

 (BTM) The contestant was selected as one of the bottom entries in the Main Dish challenge but was not eliminated.
 (OUT) The contestant lost that week's Main Dish challenge and was out of the competition.

 (QUIT) The contestant volunteered to leave the competition.
In Episode 4, Cheyenne was originally eliminated. Melody, feeling Cheyenne deserved to stay, voluntarily left the competition and gave Cheyenne her spot.

Season 24: Celebrity Edition That's So 90's 
Jeff Mauro joins Anne Burrell to host the seventh run of the Celebrity Edition. The season premiered on April 24, 2022.

Recruits

Contestant progress
Red: Team Anne
Blue: Team Jeff

Key
  (WINNER) This contestant won the competition and was crowned "Best of the Worst".
 (RUNNER-UP) The contestant was the runner-up in the finals of the competition.
 (IMM) The contestant won immunity and was safe from elimination in the week's Main Dish Challenge.
 (WIN) The contestant did the best on their team in the week's Main Dish Challenge and was considered the winner.

 (BTM) The contestant was selected as one of the bottom entries in the Main Dish challenge but was not eliminated.
 (OUT) The contestant lost that week's Main Dish challenge and was out of the competition.

Season 25: Viral Sensations 
Darnell Ferguson joins Anne Burrell to host the first run of Viral Sensations. The season premiered on January 1, 2023.

During this season, a new gimmick to the show has been added. It is known as a Chef Like, which is a pin awarded to the winner of the Skill Drill Challenge on both teams and the Main Dish Challenge on both teams. The respective mentor of the team decides the winner. The recruit who accumulates the most will have a game-changing advantage. In episode 5, the recruit with the most Chef Likes on each team was able to choose one team member to switch to the opposite team. Paris, who had the most on the red team, chose Eliza to switch to Blue, whereas Michael, who had the most on the Blue team, chose Rich to switch to red. During this episode, there was no elimination.

Recruits

Contestant progress
Red: Team Anne
Blue: Team Darnell

Key
  (WINNER) This contestant won the competition and was crowned "Best of the Worst".
 (RUNNER-UP) The contestant was the runner-up in the finals of the competition.
 (IMM) The contestant won immunity and was safe from elimination in the week's Main Dish Challenge.
 (WIN) The contestant did the best on their team in the week's Main Dish Challenge and was considered the winner.

 (BTM) The contestant was selected as one of the bottom entries in the Main Dish challenge but was not eliminated.
 (OUT) The contestant lost that week's Main Dish challenge and was out of the competition.

*Denotes that this recruit was originally part of a different team but due to a twist element in episode 5, were swapped.

Mentor records

Notes

References

External links
 
 

2010 American television series debuts
2010s American cooking television series
2020s American cooking television series
Food Network original programming
Food reality television series
Television series by Optomen